Ricky Ponting is a former Australian international cricketer who was born on 19 December 1974. He made his One Day International (ODI) debut for the Australian cricket team against the South Africa cricket team in New Zealand at the age of 20 on 15 February 1995. The eldest of three children, Ponting emulated the feats of his father, playing cricket in summer and Australian rules football in winter, before breaking his arm while playing the latter sport for a junior North Launceston Football Club team as a 14-year-old. He was educated in the Tasmanian state school system, studying at Mowbray Heights Primary and Brooks High School.

Ponting received a bat sponsorship with Kookaburra Sport at 14, before being acclaimed the best 17-year-old batsman that Australian Cricket Academy coach Rod Marsh had ever seen. At 17 years and 337 days, Ponting made his first-class cricket debut for Tasmania, breaking David Boon's record as the youngest player to represent the state. Later in the season, he became the youngest Tasmanian to score a first-class century  at 18 years and 40 days, eclipsing Boon's record of 19 years and 356 days. Further into the 1992–93 season, Ponting scored two centuries in a match against Western Australia—the youngest player in Sheffield Shield history to do so. He played non-international games against national teams for Australia A in the 1994–95 World Series Cup, before making his Australian debut.

Birth
Born in Launceston, Tasmania, on 19 December 1974, Ricky Thomas Ponting is the eldest of Graeme and Lorraine Ponting's three children. His brother Drew is two years younger, while sister Renee was born when Ponting was six. Their uncle Greg Campbell played cricket for Australia in 1989 and 1990. Graeme was "a good club cricketer" and played Australian rules, while Lorraine was a state vigoro champion. "Fiercely contested" in the 1950s and 1960s, vigoro is a mix between cricket and baseball, primarily played in the Australian states of Tasmania, New South Wales and Queensland. The suburb is near York Park, Tasmania's largest capacity stadium. Residents of the area were generally known as "swampies" because the land was previously swamp on the banks of the Tamar River.

Junior ranks 
Introduced to cricket by father Graeme and uncle Greg, Ponting was able to play for the Mowbray Under–13s team at the age of 11 in 1985–86. In January 1986, he took part in the five-day annual Northern Tasmania junior cricket competition. On the Monday, he struggled to trouble the scorers, however, he bounced back with a century on Tuesday. Wednesday saw him make 117 not out and he continued his form into Thursday and Friday, scoring centuries on both days. Afterwards, bat manufacturer Kookaburra gave Ponting a sponsorship contract when he was still only 14 years old. Ponting took this form into the Under-16s week-long competition less than a month later, scoring an even century on the final day. Ted Richardson, the former head of the Northern Tasmanian Schools Cricket Association said: "Ricky is certainly the equal of David Boon at this level. At his age he's the best I've seen in the north. His technique, application, and temperament are all excellent and he has the modesty he will need to progress further."

Australian Rules football was also a big part of Ponting's sporting life; during winter he played junior football for North Launceston and until he was 14, it could have become a possible sporting option, before he broke the humerus in his right arm playing for North Launceston Under–17s. Ponting's arm was so badly damaged that it had to be pinned. Told to endure a 14-week lay-off, he never played competitive football again. He later wrote: "At one stage I was concerned that the arm injury might also stop me from playing cricket but they [the doctors] did a pretty good job on pinning the bones—and it hasn't bothered me since."

In 1986, Ponting said: "I'd love to play for Australia [...] I look up to David Boon because he's from here [Launceston]." During Tasmanian Sheffield Shield matches at the Northern Tasmanian Cricket Association Ground (NTCA Ground), Ponting served as a scoreboard assistant, thereby surrounding himself with first-class and international cricketers. After leaving school at the end of Year 10 as a 16-year-old in 1990, he began work as a groundsman at Scotch Oakburn College, a private school in Launceston. In 1991, the Northern Tasmanian Cricket Association sponsored Ponting so that he could attend a fortnight's training at the Australian Institute of Sport's Cricket Academy in Adelaide. The two weeks turned into a full two-year scholarship as he was acclaimed to be the best 17-year-old batsman Academy coach Rod Marsh had ever seen.

Playing five games for Tasmania in the 1992 Under–19 tournament in Perth, Ponting scored 350 runs, earning him selection in the 13-man national Under–19 development squad for the upcoming tour of South Africa—the first Australian cricket team to make an official tour to the country since Bill Lawry's team in 1970; South Africa were banned from international sport soon after because of their government's policy of apartheid, and were not readmitted until the 1990s. Under the captaincy of Adam Gilchrist, the Australians played four one-day and four three-day games, winning five and drawing three. Ponting scored 430 runs at an average of 45.67. Later recalling the excitement of the experience, Ponting wrote:

Early Australian domestic career
After scoring 114 not out in a club match against Riverside, Ponting became the youngest player to appear for Tasmania in a Sheffield Shield match, breaking Boon's record by 14 days. In November 1992, at the age of 17 years and 337 days, he batted at number four in the order against South Australia at the Adelaide Oval. Despite scoring 56 in a 127-run partnership with Boon, he could not prevent defeat, scoring just four in Tasmania's second innings. In his first match in Tasmania—this time against New South Wales—Ponting contributed 32 and 18 in a draw, before scoring 25 against Western Australia in a narrow loss. His first match in Sydney also marked the debut of future Australian opening bowler Glenn McGrath. At the end of the first day's play, Tasmania were 6/200, and Ponting was the only player to resist, reaching 98 not out. He eventually reached three figures the next morning, having endured three rain breaks and 54 minutes in the nineties. The century made him the youngest Tasmanian to score a first-class century, at 18 years and 40 days, eclipsing Boon's record of 19 years and 356 days. The next day he spoke about the achievement: "I knew I had to be patient and wait for it to come [...] I wasn't that nervous last night, but I was a bit nervous this morning." Dismissed for 125 out of a total of 298, Ponting scored 17 boundaries in his five-and-a-half-hour stay at the crease. Coach Greg Shipperd was impressed in what he saw: "It was an excellent innings, one of classical stroke play. The way he freely put together a good, solid innings, showed that his potential is being realised. It was an indication, for him, of what it's like to go the extra step." These performances lead Ponting to his List A debut on 13 December against Victoria in Devonport. He struggled, however, scoring 22 from 45 balls in Tasmania's defeat. His form, nonetheless, remained strong in first-class cricket, scoring another half-century, Ponting scored back-to-back centuries against Western Australia in Perth, the nation's fastest wicket, thus becoming the youngest batsmen in Shield history to score two centuries in a match. After setting a goal of scoring 500 first-class runs in the season, Ponting finished with 781 runs at 48.81. But his form in List A games were not as strong, aggregating 99 at 33 in four matches. Still, Ponting hit an unbeaten 59 from 52 balls against a touring England A side in Hobart. After the season's end, still aged 18, Ponting played seven four-day games for the Australian Academy, scoring 484 runs at 96.70.

Speculation ignited that Ponting was an outsider to be selected for the Australian squad on their 1993 tour to England. Of the speculation, Ponting said "At the start of the season I was wondering whether or not I'd play Shield cricket this year and all of a sudden there's talk in the papers that I'm a chance go on an Australian tour of England. I think it's way out of reach – there are blokes like [South Australian] Jamie Siddons who have scored 20 or 30 first-class centuries who are ahead of me. Nevertheless, Shipperd thought Ponting could handle the experience: "A lot of attention affects different people in different ways, but Ricky is such a well-rounded young fella that it hasn't changed him. I've told him to enjoy the all the attention and if he just keeps on being himself I'm sure he'll cope well with all the success that I imagine he will achieve." The selectors eventually chose Western Australian batsman Damien Martyn for the tour, with Ponting selected in the Academy squad captained by Justin Langer, which toured India and Sri Lanka for seven games in August and September in 1993. Australian success was limited, with only a few wins. No batsman scored a century, but Ponting reached 99 not out in a one-day game in Colombo. He finished the tour second highest in the run-scorers behind Langer.
Before the start of the 1993–94 Sheffield Shield season, Ponting spoke of his goals for the summer. "I've got myself the goal of making 1,000 runs in the season. Hopefully, I can stay in the middle long enough or do that. You can't worry about other people's expectation. I don't care at all what is written in the press. I like to read it but it doesn't go too far into my head." In Tasmania's final round-robin match of the season, they needed to defeat South Australia outright to qualify for the final. Set 366 runs to win in 102 overs, Ponting joined Dene Hills at the crease with the score at 2/35. Ponting scored 161 in a 290-run partnership that ended with Tasmania needing just 41 runs for victory. Despite Tasmania losing four quick wickets after his dismissal, they won with four wickets in hand. Disappointingly for Ponting, he could not repeat the performance in the final against New South Wales. He scored just one and 28, as Tasmania were defeated by an innings and 61 runs. The season saw Ponting score 965 runs at 48.25, close to his 1,000 run goal.

A month after the final, he was again selected for the Academy squad for three limited overs matches against a touring Indian team. Queenslander Stuart Law captained the Australian side that included former Australian keeper Rod Marsh. In Australia's victory in the first match in Canberra, Ponting top-scored with 71, before making 52 in a victory in Sydney. The last match was also successful for the home team, with Ponting not required to bat.

Ponting started his 1994–95 campaign with a century against eventual Shield champions Queensland in Brisbane, in a performance that impressed Queensland captain Allan Border, who had just retired from international cricket after leading the national team for a decade. Border said of Ponting: "He's just an outstanding prospect. The thing I like about him is he's very aggressive, he plays all the shots, he's equally at home on the front foot as the back foot. He cuts and pulls well, and he drives well. You don't often see that, the ability to get on [the] front foot and back foot and play equally well."
Speculation once again arose that Ponting could be selected for the upcoming tour to the West Indies. When Tasmania played Western Australia at Bellerive Oval on 4 November 1994, Ponting was 117 not out at stumps. That century was his fifth successive triple-figure score against Western Australia; Sir Donald Bradman is the only other batsman to score five consecutive centuries against another state in Shield history. He continued to 211, sharing a 319-run stand with captain Rod Tucker in the process. Ten days after the double century, Ponting was named in the Australian XI to play England at Bellerive Oval in a match that was used as practice for fringe Australian players before the upcoming series in the West Indies. Future Australian representatives Matthew Hayden, Langer, Greg Blewett and Martyn were also selected. In a drawn match, Ponting compiled a half-century, but Martyn scored a century.

A fourth team was introduced to the World Series Cup in 1994–95—Australia A—for the only time. The Australian selectors re-shuffled both teams so that some players stepped up from the A team to the main Australian team, and vice versa, during the competition, depending on their performance. The Australian captain Mark Taylor was not a fan of the innovation: "... out there, on the field there was an ultra-competitive attitude by blokes of both teams, spurred on by the crows who were barracking for against Australia and supporting the underdog Australia A, who were pepped up and firing. Of course it gave the Australia A guys a chance to break into the Australian team, but to me the focus of the summer was on beating the Poms [England] in the Tests and winning the World Series, not beating our own Australian mates." Despite the negative feedback, the concept gave Ponting a chance on the international stage, and he scored 161 runs at 26.83 with one half-century. Two weeks after the World Series, Ponting was selected in the squad for the upcoming one-day tri-series involving South Africa, India and hosts New Zealand. Trent Bouts, a cricket writer for The Australian said: "His selection at age 20 would normally represent a bold gamble on youth but so precocious are his talents it amounts to a routine progression." Ponting made his ODI debut against South Africa at the Basin Reserve in Wellington on 15 February 1995.

Notes

References
 
 

Australian cricketers
Early lives by sportspeople